The Medical Arts Building is a historic building located at 1020 SW Taylor Street in Downtown Portland, Oregon. It was completed in 1925 by the Houghtaling & Dougan architecture firm, and was listed on the National Register of Historic Places on November 6, 1986.

See also
 National Register of Historic Places listings in Southwest Portland, Oregon

References

External links
 

1925 establishments in Oregon
Buildings and structures completed in 1925
Italian Renaissance Revival architecture in the United States
National Register of Historic Places in Portland, Oregon
Southwest Portland, Oregon
Portland Historic Landmarks